, also known as eat, is a Japanese broadcast network affiliated with the ANN. Their headquarters are located in Matsuyama, Ehime Prefecture.

History 
1995 April 1- Station starts operations as the fourth TV station in Ehime Prefecture.
2006 October 1- Digital terrestrial television begins operations at the Matsuyama Main Station.
2011 July 24- Analog television ceases operations in 44 prefectures.

Stations

Analog Stations 
Matsuyama (Main Station) JOEY-TV 25ch
Niihama 14ch
Uwajima 16ch
Kikuma 52ch
Ōzu 44ch
Yawatahama 25ch
Minamiuwa 29ch
Kawanoe 38ch
Nakayama 18ch

Digital Stations (ID:5) 
Matsuyama (Main Station) JOEY-DTV 17ch

Programs

Rival Stations 
Nankai Broadcasting (RNB)
Ehime Broadcasting (EBC)
i-Television (ITV)

External links 
 eat official site

All-Nippon News Network
Asahi Shimbun Company
Companies based in Ehime Prefecture
Television stations in Japan
Television channels and stations established in 1995
Mass media in Matsuyama, Ehime